Mostafaabad may refer to:
 Mostafaabad, Kuhrang, Chaharmahal and Bakhtiari Province
 Mostafaabad, Shahrekord, Chaharmahal and Bakhtiari Province
 Mostafaabad, West Azerbaijan